Eduardo Jorge de Lima, often referred to as simply Lima (22 August 1920 – 17 July 1973), was a Brazilian footballer who played as a midfielder and spent his entire career playing for Palmeiras, from 1938 to 1954, winning the 1951 Copa Rio.

He also played in eight matches for the Brazil national football team, from 1944 to 1947, and was part of Brazil's squad for the 1946 South American Championship.

Honours 
Palmeiras

 Copa Rio (1951)
 São Paulo State Championship (1940, 1942, 1944, 1947, 1950)
 Rio-São Paulo Tournament (1951)

Brazil
 Roca Cup (1945)

References

External links
 

1920 births
1973 deaths
Footballers from São Paulo
Sociedade Esportiva Palmeiras players
Brazilian footballers
Brazil international footballers
Association football midfielders